Vasco Serpa (born 21 August 1971) is a Portuguese sailor. He competed in the Laser event at the 1996 Summer Olympics.

References

External links
 

1971 births
Living people
Portuguese male sailors (sport)
Olympic sailors of Portugal
Sailors at the 1996 Summer Olympics – Laser
Place of birth missing (living people)